The Charles Clary Waters House is a historic house at 2004 West 22nd Street in Little Rock, Arkansas.  It is a two-story wood-frame structure, with a gabled roof, weatherboard siding, and a brick foundation.  Its prominent feature is a massive temple-front portico, with two-story fluted Ionic columns supporting a dentillated entablature and fully pedimented gable.  The house was built in 1906, and is a prominent local example of Classical Revival architecture.  It was from 1911 to 1927 home to Charles Clary Waters, a prominent local attorney who served for many years as a US District Attorney.

The house was listed on the National Register of Historic Places in 1979.

See also
National Register of Historic Places listings in Little Rock, Arkansas

References

Houses on the National Register of Historic Places in Arkansas
Neoclassical architecture in Arkansas
Houses completed in 1906
Houses in Little Rock, Arkansas
National Register of Historic Places in Little Rock, Arkansas
Historic district contributing properties in Arkansas
1906 establishments in Arkansas